Jim Codrington is a Canadian actor known for his roles in The Border, ZOS: Zone of Separation, Da Kink in My Hair, Pushing Tin, and others.

Filmography

Film

Television

References

External links

Living people
Canadian male film actors
Canadian male television actors
20th-century Canadian male actors
21st-century Canadian male actors
Year of birth missing (living people)
Black Canadian male actors